The Office of Laboratory Animal Welfare (OLAW) oversees the care and use of research animals in any public or private organization, business, or agency (including components of Federal, state, and local governments). The Public Health Service consists of the National Institutes of Health (NIH), Centers for Disease Control and Prevention (CDC), the Food and Drug Administration (FDA), the Agency for Healthcare Research and Quality (AHRQ), the Indian Health Service (IHS), and the Substance Abuse and Mental Health Services Administration (SAMHSA). The agencies of the PHS are a part of the U.S. Department of Health and Human Services.

PHS Policy on Humane Care and Use of Laboratory Animals (Policy) requires institutions to establish and maintain proper measures to ensure the appropriate care and use of live vertebrate animals involved in biomedical and behavioral research testing or training activities conducted or supported by the PHS. The PHS Policy endorses the "U.S. Government Principles for the Utilization and Care of Vertebrate Animals Used in Testing, Research, and Training" developed by the Interagency Research Animal Committee (IRAC).

OLAW provides guidance and interpretation of the PHS Policy, supports educational programs, and monitors compliance with the Policy by Assured institutions and PHS funding components to ensure the humane care and use of animals in PHS-supported research, testing, and training, thereby contributing to the quality of PHS-supported activities.

References

External links
OLAW homepage
PHS Policy on Humane Care and Use of Laboratory Animals
U.S. Government Principles for the Utilization and Care of Vertebrate Animals Used in Testing, Research, and Training
Animal Welfare Act
OLAW Applicability

Laboratory Animal Welfare
Animal welfare and rights in the United States